Searching for a Pulse/The Worth of the World is a split EP between American post-hardcore bands Touché Amoré and La Dispute. It was released on July 27, 2010, through No Sleep Records. The EP was the first split release for both bands and consists of two original songs from each band, all four of them featuring both vocalists.

Background
Jordan Dreyer, the lead vocalist of La Dispute when interviewed was asked the reasons behind why they recorded the extended play and he states it was because of the close relationship his band shares with Touché Amoré, saying: "Both our bands share similar ideologies and approaches to music, so it made sense to collaborate on something". Further commenting on how both he and Jeremy Bolm wanted the record to flow consistently between the music and lyrics: "so La Dispute tried to be aware of Touché’s strong points and tendencies musically throughout the writing process to give the record a pretty steady feel despite being from two different bands."

Release and promotion
No Sleep Records initially announced its release in May 2010 and was being planned for July 27, 2010 in the United States. The release was distributed on 7" vinyl which came with free digital downloads of the songs. The first pressing of the release included three color variations: 500 Black/Gold Marble, 500 Black/Beige Marble and 1000 Black. 75 were produced exclusively for the 2010 Sound and Fury festival in Santa Barbara, California which included Touché Amoré on the line-up. The festival was cut short however because of riots that broke out. It was released in the United Kingdom on September 14, 2010, in which it sold out in seconds. British magazine journal Rock Sound began to stream the tracks off the EP to coincide with its release in the United Kingdom. Combining its three pressings, Including 48 copies made exclusively for Record Store Day 2012, 6,148 copies have been pressed since its release.

Track listing

Personnel
Touché Amoré
Jeremy Bolm – vocals
Clayton Stevens – guitars
Nick Steinhardt – guitars
Tyler Kirby – bass guitar
Elliot Babin – drums

La Dispute
Jordan Dreyer – vocals, percussion
Brad Vander Lugt – drums, keyboards, percussion
Chad Sterenberg – guitars
Kevin Whittemore – guitars
Adam Vass – bass guitar, additional guitars

References

Touché Amoré albums
La Dispute (band) EPs
2010 EPs
Split EPs
No Sleep Records EPs